Bahram Mirza Moezz-od-Dowleh Qajar (1806- 1882) was the second son of Abbas Mirza who was the son and crown prince of Fat'h Ali Shah Qajar.  He was an educated and erudite man expert on many subjects, which won him the nickname of Mollah Bahram (Knowledgeable Bahram). As the uncle of Naser al-Din Shah, he was the minister of justice during his reign.

The Persian province of Joshekan was created as a fiefdom for Mirza. Upon his death in 1882 it passed to his son Ism'ail Mirza Moezz-od-Dowleh.

Napoleon Bonaparte extended a hand in friendship to Persia, deeming the alliance a helpful strategy for his ambitious and never accomplished plan to conquer India. Many military advisers were sent to Persia for the training of the Persian army. Bahram Mirza received such training under the tutelage of General Gardanne, which resulted in his authoring a book called the Discipline of War. Only one surviving lithographed copy of this book exists today, which is in the Moezzi family archives.

Bahram Mirza Moezzeddoleh is the founder of the Moezzi family. The Moezeddoleh title was reduced to Moezzi under the new law decreed by Reza Shah Pahlavi after the 1925 coup and ultimately the end of the Qajar dynasty.  He died at the age of seventy six in 1882, leaving 82 progeny.

References

 Safa Moezzi-Azimi, The Moezzi Genealogy, 03-12-2010

Qajar princes
1882 deaths
Iranian royalty
1806 births
19th-century Iranian politicians